Conan the Adventurer is an animated television series adaptation of Conan the Barbarian, the literary character created by Robert E. Howard in the 1930s. Produced by Jetlag Productions in association with Sunbow Productions, the series debuted on September 13, 1992, ran for 65 episodes and concluded on November 22, 1993. The series was developed by Christy Marx who served as the sole story editor.

The series was produced in association with Graz Entertainment for the first 13-episode season; AB Productions and Jean Chalopin's Créativité et Développement for the remaining episodes. The series also spawned a small toyline in 1992 created by Hasbro. This first incarnation of Conan in cartoon form performed much better than its follow-up cartoon, Conan and the Young Warriors, which lasted only 13 episodes.

Plot
Conan lived in Cimmeria with his parents throughout his childhood. While out with his grandfather one night on a trek, "fiery tears" or meteors dropped from the skies. Conan collected them and brought them back to his family. Conan's father, the village blacksmith, used the ore from the meteors to forge Star Metal and used it to create various tools and weapons that would never rust or break or dull. He sold them, but his finest work, a magnificent sword, he kept for Conan. It was laid in a crypt and covered over with a heavy stone slab. Conan's father told his son that only when he was "man enough" (i.e., strong enough) to push off the stone slab, could he rightfully claim the sword.

Meanwhile, the evil Serpent Man wizard Wrath-Amon learned of Star Metal and that in addition to its strength that it possessed the power to open portals between dimensions. He thus sought Star Metal to release his deity Set from "the Abyss" to which he long ago had been banished by the combined powers of virtually every living wizard then on Earth for trying to enslave the human race. As part of his search, Wrath-Amon sought out Conan's family. Conan's father told Wrath-Amon that he had sold all of the Star Metal, but the wizard refused to believe it. The wizard was right for aside from the sword, it was revealed in a later episode that Conan's father had hidden pieces of Star Metal with other villagers. Wrath-Amon used the spell of living stone upon Conan's family.

Conan by then had gone to claim his Star Metal sword to attack Wrath-Amon and his followers. When the Star Metal sword got near Wrath-Amon, it disrupted his magic and showed his reptilian face. To this, he said "Those who see the true face of Wrath-Amon must perish!" (this scene is similar to one in the film). Having chased away the wizard, Conan then turned to his family and swore in the name of their god Crom to find a way of releasing them from the spell.

Conan's adventures thus begin as he searches Hyboria looking for a way to cure his family and free the land from Wrath-Amon's rule. Wrath-Amon's henchmen are also shapeshifting Serpent Men. When Conan's Star Metal sword is close enough to them, it broke the spell that disguised them and revealed their true form to be Serpent Men. When Star Metal made contact with the Serpent Men, it banishes them to the Abyss with Set. Spies and agents of Set and Stygia, many of them also Serpent Men, were present in many cities, nations and tribes throughout the land in the age of Conan.

As compared with the original Conan stories and the Marvel Comics such as King Conan, Conan Saga, Conan the Barbarian and Conan the King, the cartoon Conan displays a higher degree of modern morality. While the original Conan is a thief, a killer, and a philanderer, the cartoon Conan has more in common with sword-wielding children's cartoon characters such as He-Man. At one point, he refuses to join a pirate crew on the grounds that it is wrong to steal, he refuses to strike unarmed or defeated opponents. He is a kind and caring character, albeit a little naive, who stands up for his friends and what he sees to be right and is very respectable. The show also reduced the violence of the original to levels deemed suitable for the younger target audience, deliberately making the Serpent Men "banished" with any touch of the heroes' weapons rather than actually struck.

Episodes

Characters

Heroes
Conan (voiced by Michael Donovan) – The main character of the animated series, a brave barbarian from Cimmeria. He is tall, long-haired and possesses a large muscular build. He is incredibly strong and tough. Conan's eyes are blue, and his hair is raven black, like Howard's original description. Unlike Robert Howard's descriptions, the barbarian's clothes in the animated series are quite open and emphasize his muscles. He wears a fur cloak, a leather loincloth with a metal belt depicting a lion's head (which appeared on Conan's iron belt after he acquired his totem animal), iron bracelets on his wrists, and leather boots. Sometimes Conan appears in padded clothing that covers his head, torso and legs, and during his distant wanderings, he and other protagonists can be seen in clothes that correspond to local traditions. The barbarian's ears are adorned with gold earrings, and his neck is decorated with the Vathelos amulet, the true properties of which he learns during the development of the plot. Armed with a long sword of stars metal and a magical shield that is the hideout of little phoenix Needle. Conan is excellent with weapons and is trained in fistfighting and blacksmithing. He acts in accordance with the internal code and is the type of the "noble barbarian." In the first episodes, he cannot read, washes once a year, and prefers brute force. Over time, he masters literacy, martial arts and other knowledge, remaining in his soul the same simple and straightforward man. Thanks to Zula and Jaballu, he found his totem animal - a lion. Conan sacredly honors the customs of his people and the god Crom, whom he often mentions. He likes beautiful women and is attractive to them. Not indifferent to Jezmine. Because of his naivety and gullibility, the Cimmerian more than once becomes a victim of villainous intrigues and hypnotic spells.
 Thunder – Conan's willful (but loyal) horse, eventually armed with Star Metal horse shoes that were made from Snagg's grapnel. Thunder was stubborn, regularly refusing to ride into cities. On more than one occasion he threw Conan off his back rather than enter a city.
 Needle (voiced by Michael Beattie) – Conan's feisty fledgling phoenix sidekick and only constant companion. He possessed the ability to enter flat surfaces and magically transform into a phoenix design (although he needed his magical tail feathers to accomplish this feat, and lost this power if he lost one of them). He spent most of his time inside Conan's shield. Needle speaks in the third person giving others nicknames (i.e. he calls Conan "big dumb barbarian") and loves to eat pomegranates. He eventually learns how to harness his full power and aid Conan in battle. When in public, Needle (who has the ability to speak) is often asked to impersonate a parrot in order to not arouse suspicion, an act which he greatly resents. As a phoenix, death for him only means to rise again from his own ashes and as such, with effort, can sometimes recall useful information from his 'ancestors.' In an alternate future, Needle was turned into a statue by Set, but this timeline was averted. Conan and the Young Warriors mentions obliquely that Conan grew tired of Needle and made a meal of him, although it is possible that it was just a joke.
 Zula (voiced by Arthur Burghardt) – Prince of the black tribe of the Vassai, cousin of Horus. A black warrior with the same muscular build as Conan. Zula's face has three multi-colored triangles on both sides - the symbol of the vassai. Zula's eyes are black, black hair tied with a black elastic band in a ponytail. He wears light clothes made of tiger skin, a belt with a tiger's head (which appeared on Zula's belt after he acquired his totem animal) and leather boots, a gold bracelet on his left wrist, and a leather one on his right. Sometimes Zula appears in insulated clothing that covers his head, torso and legs, and during distant wanderings he and other protagonists can be seen in clothes that correspond to local traditions. The prince's ears are decorated with silver earrings, and his neck is decorated with a necklace of three tiger fangs. Hypnotist. Zula met Conan while being a rowing slave in the galleys of Rath Amon. After his release, he considers the Cimmerian his blood brother. Educated, prudent and wise, he worships the animal spirit of Jebalah. Using his sign, the vassai prince can summon wild animals for help. Thanks to Jeballu, Zula also mastered hypnosis and acquired his totem animal, the tiger. In battle, he first uses a bolas of star metal, which entangles enemies. Later, due to the inconvenience, he makes himself another throwing weapon - a boomerang. In addition, Zula is a masterful archer. Martial arts master.
 Jezmine (voiced by Janyse Jaud) – An agile and beautiful circus performer who possesses a set of Star Metal throwing stars, she started as a thief but became an honest woman for the rest of the series (but is in love with Conan nonetheless) especially where the first point is that Conan and Jezmine are seen climbing a tower where Jezmine attempts to steal some priceless treasures. Her parents are later revealed to be a nobleman and woman in the city of Tarantia. To her horror, she learns that her mother serves Wrath-Amon and her father is the Serpent Man Astivus, making her a half-breed. From that moment, she is terrified her Serpent Man heritage will assert itself. When her father Astivus, who loved Jezmine's mother, sides with Jezmine and her mother against Wrath-Amon, Wrath-Amon banishes her father and mother to the Abyss. A magical potion applied to her Star Metal shuriken allow Jezmine to magically summon the throwing stars to return to her. She shared this potion with Zula. Jezmine hated Astivus, despite his love for her. She and Conan were able to free her mother during a trip to the Abyss, and later Astivus escaped when Set and the Serpent-Men banished over the years were freed from the Abyss by Wrath-Amon. Once again, Astivus chose Jezmine and her mother over serving Set, and it is implied in the final episode that Jezmine might be willing to reconcile with him. Unlike Valeria from the original 1982 film where she was killed by Thulsa Doom, Wrath-Amon doesn't kill her.
 Greywolf (voiced by Scott McNeil) – A wizard from the magical city of Xanthus. Originally armed with a bare staff, he was given the mystical "Claw of Heaven" made of Star Metal that was mounted atop his staff and effectively doubled his magical power (as stated on a couple occasions). His brother and sister were transformed into wolves in a plot by the Stygian queen and sorceress Mesmira. As a result, he consistently seeks a cure for their condition alongside of Conan. In the finale, he isn't able to turn his siblings back to normal, though he did manage to give them a small sampling of the cure that causes them to revert to human form once per month (on a full moon). 
 Sasha and Misha (voiced by Kathleen Barr and Scott McNeil) – Greywolf's older brother and sister who are also skilled in magic. They were transformed into wolves by Mesmira using poison from the thorns of the Lycanthrus Plant as part of her plot to become powerful. Mesmira planned to use the transformed Sasha and Misha in her plot only for a combination of their fellow wizards to cleanse the poison's madness from them. During the episode "Thorns of Midnight," a single flower from the Lycanthrus Plant was found that could transform one of the siblings back into a human. Not wanting to have to choose, the flower was split down the middle with Sasha and Misha each eating half giving them the ability to resume human form when the full moon is in the night sky.
 Snagg (voiced by Garry Chalk) – A Viking-like barbarian as strong as Conan from Vanirmen tribe, which lives at the sea shore. Snagg likes to travel by water. He often quarrels with Conan because they grew up in neighboring countries with different culture. Once even a war happened between them. Despite it, Snagg and Conan are true friends. Snagg also has Star Metal weapons in the form of an axe and grapnel. Later, he gave his grapnel to make Star Metal horseshoes for Thunder when Thunder saved his life. Conan and Snagg start as rivals, but become increasingly friendly. They continue to compete with and insult each other, but it becomes jovial and good-natured. Snagg and Conan are very similar, though Snagg is generally less serious and controlled.
 Falkenar (voiced by Alec Willows) – Champion of the kingdom of Kusan, he uses the "Mantle of Wind" to fly and is armed with a Star Metal whip. Falkenar and Windfang are bitter enemies through repeated attempts by the villain to invade Kusan. He has a female pet falcon named Stormclaw.

Supporting
 The Kari Dragon (voiced by Doug Parker) – The only dragon character in the series, the Kari Dragon was once imprisoned in an artifact and could be summoned to do the bidding of mortal men. Conan summoned him and granted him freedom for which the dragon was grateful. However, when Conan later came to him for aid, the dragon gave him a series of tests which Conan passed. When the final battle against Set came, the dragon battled Set to provide Conan with enough time to escape Set and his minions, sacrificing himself in the process.
 Epimetrius the Sage (voiced by Jim Byrnes): Leader of the wizards that banished Set to the Abyss thousands of years ago. His ghost is Conan's guide in his quest against Wrath-Amon and to free his parents. Epimetrius presents Conan his shield and companion Needle and on a few occasions aids Conan in his adventures.
 Zogar Sag (voiced by Doug Parker) – The Pict shaman-chief Zogar Sag aids Conan and his friends in battle against Wrath-Amon, their common enemy. Unlike in the novels and comics, he does not worship Jhebbal-Sag (although he does support Zula's suggestion to ask the deity's aid) and he is a good guy in this show.
 Dong Hee (voiced by Richard Newman) – An elder among the Silent Dragons of Phenion, Dong Hee was Conan's instructor in the art of ninjutsu and become an infrequent ally and father figure.
 Torrinon (voiced by Garry Chalk) – Master inventor and a descendant from wizards, Torrinon is a little person that showed little talent in actual magic, but would apply himself after meeting Conan.

Villains

The Snake Cult
The Snake Cult is an evil religion that worships Set and lures away victims, even rulers who fear the wrath of Wrath-Amon. Wrath-Amon preaches the wicked religion of Set and so did the sorcerer Ram-Amon before him. While some of its members are human, current or former, the Snake Cult's primary members are the reptilian Serpent Men. While able to assume human form, the Serpent Men share their god Set's weakness for Star Metal and would end up in the Abyss if exposed to anything made of Star Metal.

Set (voiced by Richard Newman) – A huge snake-like deity of the Stygians and the main antagonist of the animated series, he is imprisoned in the Abyss, from which he commands the serpent-men through his regent, Wrath-Amon. Set was banished by magicians many thousands of years ago and longs to return to the world to enslave all of humanity. To do this, he requires several pyramids with rings of star metal, for which his minions hunt relentlessly. The most dangerous of Conan's enemies, Set possesses incomparable strength and great hypnotic power. Once he managed to hypnotize Conan, and only Needle's intervention prevented the death of the hero. At the end of the series, Conan and his friends imprison him again in the Abyss (this time, it is said, "forever").
 Wrath-Amon (voiced by Scott McNeil) – The evil sorcerer who currently leads the Snake Cult as its high priest and is the personal enemy of Conan. He was originally a large gila monster but was transformed into a Serpent Man-like creature by his master, Ram-Amon. He then overthrew his master by taking the Black Ring from him. His mission now is to free his god, Set, with the help of the Star Metal. Conan's grandfather states that Wrath-Amon's evil is legendary and that he is feared by kings. Wrath-Amon himself fears only Set, his deity. Wrath-Amon led the attack on Conan's village, in which he turned Conan's parents into living stone, rather than killing them, as in the original Conan line. Like Thoth-Amon in that original line, he is powerless without his black ring (whose destruction in this series would cause the spell of living stone on Conan's family to be undone). In the series finale, Wrath-Amon is empowered by Set, greatly increasing in size, but Conan manages to return him to his original gila monster form with the power of the Amulet of Vathelos.
 Dregs (voiced by Doug Parker) – Wrath-Amon's sneaky Nāga assistant with a hood like a cobra and a rattle like a rattlesnake. He could be considered Needle's nemesis as he frequently tries to catch and eat the phoenix. He once became Dregs-Amon when Wrath-Amon was going to undergo hibernation. He quickly changed his loyalties when Ram-Amon is freed by Conan, then Wrath-Amon was defeated, and served under Ram-Amon. He was crushed by a large statue in the final episode, but it is not revealed if he survived or not.
 Skulkur (voiced by Doug Parker) – One of Wrath-Amon's henchmen. A powerful undead who can raise skeletons as warriors and star metal would break the spell that animated them. He was once Sakumbe (voiced by Blu Mankuma), a human member of another Snake Cult branch in Africa where Set is worshipped as Damballah (it is assumed that they are cannibalistic as well). Sakumbe helped a man seize the power of the high priest in return for a promise of power, but the new high priest betrayed him. He then swore himself into Wrath-Amon's service, who empowered him with the Black Ring. When he tried to take his revenge, the new high priest who had betrayed him tried to transform him into a zombie slave, but his magic and the Black Ring's magic clashed and transformed him into the skeletal Skulkur. His final fate is unknown.
 Windfang (voiced by Doug Parker) – Windfang is a fire-breathing, four-armed winged dragonoid enslaved by Wrath-Amon. Windfang was once a human general named Venturas from Koth that opposed Wrath-Amon 200 years before the events in the series. His king sent him to invade Stygia, but his men fled from Wrath-Amon's evil sorcery. Venturas fought on, but he was captured and mutated by Wrath-Amon. Being a cruel despot, he then released Windfang who flew to his fiancée who screamed and reacted with horror upon seeing him. Realizing he had nothing left to live for upon Wrath-Amon finding him in his eyrie, he agreed to serve Wrath-Amon upon his arrival in exchange for a promise to transform him back into a human at some point in the future (a promise Wrath-Amon certainly never intended to keep). He has an eyrie high in the mountains where he keeps trophies of his long lost past and human self. His eyrie was located close to or within the borders of Kusan (the kingdom of Falkenar) and he raided it often making the two are bitter enemies. He was in love with Jezmine initially because she reminded him of his dead fiancée Lady Mirim, but although she showed him kindness she didn't love him. Windfang also commands other flying reptilian creatures similar to himself. Windfang often sought to find a way to transform back into a human without Wrath-Amon or to force Wrath-Amon to keep his promise, and made it clear he would not continue in Wrath-Amon's service if he could regain his humanity. In one occasion, he succeeds in breaking his curse and regaining his human form. But upon returning to Koth, he realizes that all the things and people he cared about no longer existed, leaving Venturas without a purpose in life. After Wrath-Amon appears and forcefully transforms him into Windfang again upon sacrificing himself, he resigns his fate as the villain's servant. He has twice worked with Yin Doo in plots that revolve around Kusan. His final fate is unknown.
 Ram-Amon (voiced by Arthur Burghardt) – Wrath Amon's creator and predecessor, a Stygian sorcerer and apparently of a human-like race. After creating the lizard man who became Wrath Amon, Ram-Ammon is betrayed by his creation after he lost the black ring. After at least 200 years of imprisonment (as Wrath-Amon was shown to be the leader when Windfang as Venturas invaded Stygia 200 years ago), he was released by Conan as he knew the knowledge of the Black Ring. He later replaced Wrath-Amon in aiding Set after his defeat by Conan, and escaped following the defeat of Set.

Other villains
 Mesmira (voiced by Kathleen Barr) – A Stygian witch who acts as an adversary, and sometimes an unreliable ally of the protagonists. Secretly dreams of overthrowing Rath-Amon to become the forever young queen of Stygia. Not indifferent to Conan and Prince Zula; unable to seduce them, she tries to subdue the barbarian and Zula with the help of hypnosis and make them her personal slaves. Her fascination with Conan and Zula is particularly disliked by Jasmine, in part due to her own love for Conan and her friendship with Zula. The second implacable enemy of Mesmira is Greywulf, whose brother and sister were turned into wolves by a sorceress. The protagonists do not trust the insidious Mesmira, but she more than once manages to set them conditions that they cannot refuse. At the end of the series, Mesmira wins the remains of the Black Ring.
 Gora (voiced by Garry Chalk) – Zula's cousin. Hoping to overthrow the vassai prince, he secretly serves Rath-Amon and intrigues the protagonists. He has the same muscular build as Conan and Zula.  Unlike Zula, Horu does not possess hypnosis, but uses black magic, in particular, Voodoo magic. Using dolls, Voodoo tried to kill Conan and Zulu, but the intervention of Conan and Amra's lion did not allow him to do so. Gora is finally imprisoned.
 Yin Doo (voiced by Scott McNeil) – A warlord who was exiled from Kusan for his evil deeds. He often teams up with Windfang in his various plots. His final fate is unknown.

References to deities
There are references to other beings (mostly deities) most of which who are never seen in the series.

Crom – The main deity of the Cimmerians. In Conan the Barbarian he was a Deity of the earth and asked the recently dead before they entered Valhalla the secret of steel. In this series it is learned that he fervently believes in freedom of men when Conan is offered a chance to a rule a city and its slaves which he outright refuses.
Mitra – Another deity who does not appear but has priests. In the series finale it is revealed that he has paladins and one of his priests marries a couple.
Kraken – Mentioned by a pirate in an episode of Conan. It stands to reason that this is a sea deity as the Kraken was a mythical creature of the sea in Norse Mythology.
Woden – The main deity of the Vanirmen.
 Tarim – A deity worshiped in Xanthus.
 Jhebbal-Sag (voiced by Richard Newman in normal form, Doug Parker in corrupted form) – The Lord of Beasts worshiped by the Wasai, he could be invoked to commune with animals. He appeared once in the series in the episode "The Vengeance of Jhebbal Sag." He was captured and corrupted by Wrath'Amon before being restored to his normal self.
 Erlik the Flame-Lord (voiced by Scott McNeil) – Wielder of the Crystal of Light and responsible for the imprisonment of the elder demon Shulgareth, the ruling family of Kusan descended from his blood. He appeared once in the series in the episode "When Tolls the Bell of Night." One of his feats of seeming divine was to bring light to world after imprisoning the demon.
 Ahx' oon – a being which may be a deity, which appeared in the episode Curse of Ahx'oon, He/it is a large masked creature who resides in a lava pit, and is greatly respected for its knowledge and counsel. A follower of it said she would marry Set himself if Ahx'oon wished it. He was able to be controlled by a mask.
 Herarora, Child of the Sun - Mentioned by Pyro, a fully grown Phoenix in the Crevasse of Winds Episode, he invokes his/her in a healing spell to heal his injured wing.
 Ondarvard- mentioned by the spellbinder in the episode Birth of Wrath Amon, is invoked to send himself and conan to different points in time, also invoked by Greywolf to send Conan back into the past, most likely a deity of time.

Nations, tribes, and groups
 Cimmerians – Conan is a Cimmerian, a tribe that tends animals in the mountains and valleys. Despite being called barbarians, they have settlements and do not invade other towns when not at war. Barbarian is probably a reference to their relative primitiveness; they have villages, but not large towns, wear little clothing, paint their bodies for war, and are largely warriors. They are descended from the Atlantians. Their chief, and possibly only, deity is Crom.
 Wasai – The Wasai are a large, powerful and wealthy tribe, of whom Zula is a prince. The Wasai are African and live in the jungle.
 Vanirmen – The Vanirmen, including Snagg, are a barbarian tribe almost completely analogous to Vikings, except that they are not pillagers. They serve a god called "Woden" and are a seafaring and fishing tribe, whose organization and outlook is similar to the Cimmerians.
 Picts – The Picts are an extremely primitive tribe, who paint their bodies. They are similar to the Picts of Scotland, in the name, painting, and habit of pillaging other towns, though they live in or near the jungle. Nearby tribes and nations tend to fear the Picts.

Home releases
In the UK, Maximum Entertainment (Under license from Jetix Europe) has released a single DVD featuring 5 episodes in 2004, and later released the complete season one DVD set containing all 13 episodes of season one of the series in 2008, uncut and in their original story order. This set was released in Region 2 format, but is now out of print.

Force Entertainment released the complete series on DVD in Australia in Region 4 format in a series of 16 single-disc DVD volumes, with four episodes per disc, excluding episode 27 (A Needle in a Haystack) which is thankfully featured on the Region 1 Season 2 Part 2 DVD Release.

In 2011, Shout! Factory began releasing the series on DVD in Region 1 for the very first time.  To date, they have released season 1 as well as the first half of season 2 on DVD.

Reception
The animated version was popular with fans and audiences alike, and also praised for staying largely true to Robert E. Howard's material, and was one of the most popular sword and sorcery cartoons alongside He-Man and Dungeons & Dragons.

However, it did receive some criticism, for being more suitable to younger audience, removing the adult content and toning down the violence. According to The A.V. Club, this cartoon, like the other two Conan television series, "has been significantly defanged, dumbing down and infantilizing the character to the degree that he's robbed of his savage appeal".

See also
 Conan and the Young Warriors

References

External links

 
 

1990s American animated television series
1990s Canadian animated television series
1990s French animated television series
1992 American television series debuts
1993 American television series endings
1992 Canadian television series debuts
1993 Canadian television series endings
1992 French television series debuts
1993 French television series endings
American children's animated action television series
American children's animated adventure television series
American children's animated fantasy television series
Canadian children's animated action television series
Canadian children's animated adventure television series
Canadian children's animated fantasy television series
French children's animated action television series
French children's animated adventure television series
French children's animated fantasy television series
Conan the Barbarian television series
First-run syndicated television programs in the United States
First-run syndicated television shows in Canada
Television series by Sunbow Entertainment
Television series by Claster Television
Television series created by Christy Marx